Chardeneux is a village of Wallonia, part of the district of Bonsin, in the municipality of Somme-Leuze, located in the province of Namur, Belgium.

Chardeneux is a member of the Les Plus Beaux Villages de Wallonie ("The Most Beautiful Villages of Wallonia") association. The village has a Romanesque church and the village houses, from the 18th and 19th centuries, display a uniformity of style typical for the Condroz region.

References

External links

Populated places in Namur (province)
Somme-Leuze